Raziyələr (also, Rəzələr and Razalyar) is a village in the Quba Rayon of Azerbaijan.  The village forms part of the municipality of Çiçi.

References

External links

Populated places in Quba District (Azerbaijan)